Scoop is a compilation album by Pete Townshend containing 25 demos of various released and unreleased songs by The Who, as well as demos of entirely new material.  The album has liner notes written by Townshend.

History
The album was the first in a series of three Scoop collections: Another Scoop was released in 1987 and Scoop 3 in 2001. All three albums were 2-disc sets, and in 2002 a pared-down compilation of them all was released as Scooped. Remastered versions of the original albums were released in 2006, and again in 2017.

Track listing
All songs written and composed by Pete Townshend, except where noted.

References

1983 compilation albums
Demo albums
Pete Townshend compilation albums
Atco Records compilation albums